Harbor High School is a high school located in Santa Cruz, California, with roughly 950 members of its student body. The mascot, Petey the Pirate, sports the school colors of green and gold.

Arts Programs 
Harbor High is well known for its variety of arts programs. The school's theater department offers a student-directed play and musical each year, amassing over 100 participants in total. Until 2018, the Harbor High Drama department was run by Cathy Warner, who had taught and directed for three decades.  Harbor High School has an award-winning music program that boasts over 120 members and offers band, varsity band, and their prestigious jazz ensemble.  Harbor High also hosts Escapade, a local dance group also run by students.

Sports 
Harbor competes in the Santa Cruz Coast Athletic League alongside Santa Cruz High School, Scotts Valley High School, Soquel High School, San Lorenzo Valley High School and Aptos High School.

The school has somewhat of a notorious history with football, winning its first varsity game since 2008 on August 31, 2019. Harbor lost the Monterey Bay League Championship in 1973 in a close battle with Monterey High School under coaches Claude Sharp, assistants Bob Enzweiler, Bob Nicolaisen and Larry McCook.

Perhaps the greatest Harbor Dynasty was that of Girls' Soccer who won 9 CCS Championships in 14 years under head coach Gerald Pleasant who retired in 2004. The Harbor High School boys' swim team has won 26 SCCAL Championships in the 40 years that the school has been open. In 2021, the boys' varsity soccer team won the CCS championship against Carmel.

Recently Harbor has made great strides in surf competitions, even getting an article on the National Surf League Website.

The Conch 
As Harbor and Santa Cruz are the only two teams within the City of Santa Cruz, the Pirates and Cardinals annually compete for the City Championship in football represented by a large Conch Shell trophy. Beginning in 2004, Harbor won the Shell 3 consecutive times. Santa Cruz has won the last 2 games.
2004: Santa Cruz 21, Harbor 23;
2005: Harbor 35, Santa Cruz 15;
2006: Santa Cruz 6, Harbor 28;
2007: Harbor 0, Santa Cruz 49;
2008: Santa Cruz 27, Harbor 14. As of the 2012 season Harbor holds the Conch until 2015.

Notable alumni 
Jennifer Otter Bickerdike, Music Writer and Presenter
Juli Simpson Inkster, LPGA professional golfer
Bill Miller, Major League Baseball umpire
Wali Razaqi, film producer and actor 
Adam Scott, actor
Tim Young, former NBA center
Oliver Tree, musician 
Tom Urbani, baseball player
Georgia

See also
Santa Cruz County high schools

References

External links
Harbor High School website

High schools in Santa Cruz County, California
Public high schools in California
1968 establishments in California
Educational institutions established in 1968